Iitti is a municipality of Finland. It is located in the province of Southern Finland and is part of the Päijänne Tavastia region. The administrative center of Iitti is in the village of Kausala.

Neighbour municipalities are Heinola, Kouvola, Lapinjärvi, Lahti and Orimattila. The municipality is unilingually Finnish.

In 1990, the center of Iitti, which surrounds the old parish church, was voted the most attractive kirkonkylä ("church village") in Finland.

The Kymi Ring motor sport center is located in Iitti, right next to the border of Kouvola.

History 

The surroundings of lakes Urajärvi and Pyhäjärvi have been known to be exploited as wilderness since the Stone Age, although no signs of permanent habitation from the era have been found, and the area is presumed to have been entirely uninhabitated in the interim between the Stone Age and the conversion of Finland to Christianity. By the end of paganism, Iitti had gained its first permanent inhabitants first from Hauho and Vanaja, as well as later on from Hollola.

The oldest village in Iitti is presumed to be Kauramaa, though several others are mentioned in documents dating to the Middle Ages. Administratively, Iitti was a chapel subordinated to the parish of Hollola until 1539, after which it became an independent parish that also included Nastola, Jaala, Valkeala and parts of Mäntyharju, by proclamation from Gustav I. At this time, Iitti had 14 villages and 89 estates.

Iitti suffered greatly over the Russo-Swedish War of 1788–1790, becoming a battleground as well as a headquarters for Swedish forces. The battle of Tillolankangas was one of the bloodiest over the entire war in Finland; the Swedes' victory cemented the liberation of the villages around river Kymi. Over the course of the war, 13 villages were destroyed in Iitti.

Until 2021, Iitti was part of the Kymenlaakso region before it became part of Päijänne Tavastia.

Geography

Villages
In 1968, Iitti had the following villages:

 Haapakimola
 Kauramaa
 Kausala
 Kimola
 Iitti
 Koliseva
 Koskenniska
 Lyöttilä
 Kymentaka
 Muikkula
 Niinimäki
 Perheniemi
 Radansuu
 Saaranen
 Sitikkala
 Säyhde
 Sääskjärvi
 Taasia
 Tapola
 Vuolenkoski

Demographics 
In 2020, 14.0% of the population of Iitti was under the age of 15, 55.2% were aged 15 to 64, and 31.5% were over the age of 64. The average age was 48.8, above the national average of 43.4 and regional average of 46.4. Speakers of Finnish made up 97.9% of the population and speakers of Swedish made up 0.2%, while the share of speakers of foreign languages was 1.9%. Foreign nationals made up 1.4% of the total population. 

At the end of March 2021, the population of Iitti was 6,590. The chart below, describing the development of the total population of Iitti from 1975-2020, encompasses the municipality's area as of 2021.

Urban areas 
In 2019, out of the total population of 6,711, 3,946 people lived in urban areas and 2,705 in sparsely populated areas, while the coordinates of 60 people were unknown. This made Iitti's degree of urbanization 59.3%. The urban population in the municipality was divided between two urban areas as follows:

Economy 
In 2018, 10.2% of the workforce of Iitti worked in primary production (agriculture, forestry and fishing), 35.9% in secondary production (e.g. manufacturing, construction and infrastructure), and 50.8% in services. In 2019, the unemployment rate was 9.2%, and the share of pensioners in the population was 35.8%. 

The ten largest employers in Iitti in 2019 were as follows:

Notable residents
 Lasse J. Laine – naturalist

References

External links
 
 Municipality of Iitti – Official website Finnish, Swedish, English and German languages

 
Populated places established in 1865